Korea University Business School is the business school of Korea University in Seoul, South Korea. It was formed in 1946, becoming the first business school established in Korea. The school offers an undergraduate program, full-time and part-time MBA programs, MS/PhD programs, as well as a few other non-degree programs. It received Korea's first accreditation from AACSB in 2005 and EQUIS in 2007, respectively.

Accreditations and Rankings
Korea University Business School currently holds five-year accreditation from AACSB (Association to Advance Collegiate Schools of Business) and EQUIS (European Quality Improvement System). In addition, KUBS is ratified as a full academic member of CEMS. KUBS received Korea's first accreditation for its entire degree program in 2005 and has consecutively achieved a five-year accreditation in 2010, 2015, and 2020 by AACSB. KUBS received EQUIS accreditation and five-year re-accreditation in February 2007 and June 2010, respectively. In February 2022, KUBS achieved a five-year re-accreditation for the third consecutive time.

In 2021 Top 100 Executive MBA rankings by Financial Times, UK, KUBS's Executive MBA placed first in Korea, 20th in the world. In the 2022 QS World University Rankings, Korea University is ranked 48th for Business & Management and 59th for Accounting & Finance.

Global partnerships
As of 2022, KUBS has exchange partnerships with 103 universities from 32 countries where students have the opportunity to participate in the exchange program.

The list of partner universities includes;

[North America] Ross School of Business, University of Michigan, Washington University in St. Louis, the U.S., University of British Columbia, McGill University, Canada

[Europe] ESCP Business School, ESSEC Business School, France, EBS University of Business and Law, Germany, Bocconi University, Italy

[Asia] Fudan University, Tsinghua University, China and National University of Singapore, Singapore 
 
As a member of CEMS, the Global Alliance in Management Education, the school has 34 CEMS Alliance partner schools.

In addition, KUBS currently students have the opportunity to participate in an internship at partner companies across the world. Since 1994, students have interned overseas through KUBS Global Internship program and received academic credits.

Notable alumni
KUBS has a strong alumni network throughout industries.

 Chung Mong-Jin, CEO and President of KCC Corporation
 Chung Mong-Won, Chairman of Halla Corporation
 Chung Mong-gyu, Chairman of Hyundai Development Company Group
 Chung Eui-sun, Vice Chairman of Hyundai Motor Company
 Euh Yoon-dae, Former Chairman of KB Financial Group
 Huh Chang-soo, Chairman of GS Holdings Group
 Kim Seungyu, Former Chairman & CEO of Hana Financial Group
 Koo Bon-neung, Chairman of Heesung Group
 Koo Ja-yeol, chairman and CEO of LS Partnership
 Koo Ja-Yong, chairman and CEO of E1 Corporation
 Lee Hak-Su, Former Vice Chairman of Samsung Electronics
 Lee Woong Yeul, Chairperson of KOLON
 Na Wan-Bae, Former CEO of GS Energy Corporation
 Park Hyeon-Joo, Chairman of Mirae Asset Financial Group
 Seung Myung-Ho, chairman and CEO of Dongwha Enterprise Co. Ltd.

Facilities
Korea University Business School has facilities in three buildings: KUBS Main Building, LG-POSCO Building, and Hyundai Motor Hall.

KUBS Main Building
KUBS Main Building was built in 1972. The building was renovated with the establishment of KUBS Startup Institute.

LG-POSCO Building
LG-POSCO Building was opened in 2005 to commemorate the centenary of Korea University's founding, with the vision of becoming the best business school in Asia based on RDBR, research, business-academia cooperation, and international exchanges. The Hall features lecture rooms and various facilities, including Lounge, Supex Hall, faculty offices and Sudang CLC lab.

Hyundai Motor Hall 
Hyundai Motor Hall was built in September 2013. Hyundai Motor Hall is the third building built for Korea University Business School. Finance for Hyundai Motor Hall came from over 3,600 sponsors raised from December 2009 to September 2013.

See also 
 Korea University 
 S3 Asia MBA - Joint MBA program by Fudan University, Korea University and NUS Business School

References

Korea University schools